Stephen "Steve" Gallen (born 21 November 1973) is a London-born Irish former association footballer and manager who is currently Charlton Athletic's Director of Football and a UEFA Pro Licence Coach. He is a former manager of Hong Kong Pegasus FC.

Coaching and managerial career

Queens Park Rangers
Gallen was employed for almost two decades at Queens Park Rangers, and first joined the Academy coaching setup in 1997, as the under-12s coach. In 2009, he was jointly QPR's caretaker manager for one game with fellow QPR academy coach Marc Bircham. The game was live on TV and away at West Bromwich Albion, the final score of the game was 2–2. He and Bircham were caretaker managers due to the suspension of Jim Magilton for an altercation with Ákos Buzsáky. He has two brothers, who were both professional footballers and on the QPR coaching staff at one point, Joe and Kevin. He was in the position of Senior Professional Development Coach, coach of the QPR U21 side, from 2014 to 2015, when he was promoted to First Team Coach. He left the club on 30 January 2016.

Hong Kong Pegasus
On 23 June 2016, Hong Kong Pegasus announced that Gallen would be the club's manager from the 2016–17 Hong Kong Premier League. He left the club on 3 November 2016 after struggling to adapt to Hong Kong football.

Charlton Athletic
On 19 April 2017, Gallen joined Charlton Athletic as the club's Head of Recruitment. Steve was appointed as Director of Football on 10 January 2020 soon after Charlton Athletic was taken over by East Street Investments.

Managerial statistics

Honours

As manager

Queens Park Rangers under-18s

Football League Youth Alliance Cup winner: 2009–10
Football League Youth Alliance South East Conference champion: 2010–11, 2011–12
Professional Development under-18 League Two champion: 2012–13
Esad Osmanovski Memorial Cup runner-up: 2013
Newark International Soccer Classic winner: 2013

Queens Park Rangers under-21s

Professional Development under-21 League Two  runner-up: 2013–14

References

Queens Park Rangers F.C. non-playing staff
Queens Park Rangers F.C. managers
TSW Pegasus FC managers
1973 births
Living people
Republic of Ireland youth international footballers
Republic of Ireland under-21 international footballers
Doncaster Rovers F.C. players
Footballers from Acton, London
People from County Donegal
Association footballers not categorized by position
Republic of Ireland association footballers
English football managers